Cheshunt Lock (No 9) is a lock on the River Lee Navigation at Cheshunt, Hertfordshire.

Geography 
The lock is located in the River Lee Country Park which is a part of the Lee Valley Park. The Seventy Acres Lake to the east is an important site for the bittern.  To the west is North Met Pit, a mature gravel pit of 58 acres divided into two. It is another former gravel pit which is popular with anglers and naturalists.

Public access 
Pedestrian and cycle access by the towpath which is part of the Lea Valley Walk.

Public transport 
Cheshunt railway station

References

External links 
 Cheshunt Lock - a history

Locks of the Lee Navigation
Locks in Essex
Locks in Hertfordshire